Le Quotidien is a daily newspaper in Saguenay, Quebec. The paper is owned by Power Corporation's Gesca division.

See also
List of newspapers in Canada

External links
 Le Quotidien

Mass media in Saguenay, Quebec
French-language newspapers published in Quebec
Gesca Limitée publications
Publications with year of establishment missing
Daily newspapers published in Quebec